"Sweet Harmony" is a song by British band the Beloved, released on 11 January 1993 as the first and lead single from their second studio album, Conscience (1993). It remains the band's biggest hit, peaking at number eight in the UK and becoming a club staple. The single was followed by a much talked about music video, directed by Big TV, consisting of the band's singer Jon Marsh nude and surrounded by nude women in a heaven-like setting. The video was based on the record sleeve on the Jimi Hendrix album Electric Ladyland from 1968.

"Sweet Harmony" was also included on the band's compilation albums, Single File in 1997, The Sun Rising in 2005 and Sweet Harmony: The Very Best Of The Beloved in 2011.

Background and release
"Sweet Harmony" was written and produced by founder member of the Beloved and singer Jon Marsh and his wife, Helena Marsh. It was also the first single after the departure of Steve Waddington and was recorded at Sarm West Studios in London. It was used to promote the second season of the American soap opera Melrose Place in several European countries. 

The single was released on 11 January 1993. It peaked at number three in Austria, number six in Germany and Switzerland, number seven in Greece and Italy, and number eight in the United Kingdom. In the latter, it peaked in its second week at the UK Singles Chart, on 24 January 1993. It stayed at that position for two weeks. The song was also a top-20 hit in Denmark (13), France (16), Ireland (14), and Sweden (14). On the Eurochart Hot 100, "Sweet Harmony" reached number 20 in May 1993. Outside Europe, it was a top-10 hit in Israel and peaked at number 23 on the Billboard Dance Club Songs chart in the United States.

Critical reception
AllMusic editor Jon O'Brien complimented the song as a "glorious slice of ice-cool synth pop which manages to be both brooding and euphoric at the same time". Larry Flick from Billboard described it as a "thumping dance ditty" with "slight techno nuances, an uplifting lyrical message, and singer Jon Marsh's warm, soothing tones [that] add up to a delightful jam." He added that "lyrically, "Sweet Harmony" is typical Beloved fare: spiritually uplifting and philosophical." Marisa Fox from Entertainment Weekly said that "whereas Bryan Ferry infused rock with sensuality, Marsh and his wife-partner, Helena, lace their ethereal mix with house grooves that seduce and hypnotize." She noted that the video "features a nude Marsh humming amidst a bevy of bare bohemian babes, all seated in a swirling mist. Music to steam by indeed." Dave Sholin from the Gavin Report felt that "doing their part to end the divisiveness around the globe, the Beloved do some positive preaching backed by the catchy dance/pop that's their trademark. Nothing like a positive message to inspire hope and encourage unity." Caroline Sullivan from The Guardian felt that Marsh had concocted a "pretty single" in "Sweet Harmony", "which married house rhythms to sinuous pop melodies."

Derek Weiler from Kitchener-Waterloo Record named the song a "highlight" of Conscience, complimenting it as "highly enjoyable indeed." In his weekly UK chart commentary, James Masterton stated that "the new Beloved single crashes in at 9 and has to be favoured for a possible No. 1." Pan-European magazine Music & Media noted that the "synth-dominated tune is a traditional verse-chorus pop song, which means very melodic and radio friendly." Alan Jones from Music Week described it as "slowly throbbing". Rune Slyngstad from Norwegian Nordlandsposten viewed it as "catchy, synth-oriented pop not far from Pet Shop Boys at their best." Anita Naik from Smash Hits felt the song is "wonderful" and "heartfelt stuff". Another editor, Tom Doyle, declared it as "brilliant", saying, "Jon Marsh is a diamond geezer and so it was heartwarming to witness his safe return to the charts with the brilliant "Sweet Harmony"." Richard Riccio from St. Petersburg Times wrote, "Yes, there is the consistent beat. The lilting 4/4 bounce of the first single [...] tickles the spine as well as the ear. Marsh purrs the vocals like a well-fed feline, the cool detachment of the verse compensated by the singalong chorus and warm saxophone."

Music video
The accompanying music video for "Sweet Harmony" was directed by Big TV. It consisted of a nude and seated Jon Marsh surrounded by nude women - including Tess Daly - lipsynching the lyrics. It is based on the record sleeve on Jimi Hendrix' 1968 album Electric Ladyland, which was taken by photographer David Montgomery. Clouds, fog, and white-out effects were used to create a high contrast, while the participants used their arms, legs and hair to cover themselves. In an interview, Marsh said that the video was "not intended to be sexual" and was "as asexual as you can get". The video is supposed to represent unity between humans. It was nominated for the International Viewer's Choice Award for MTV Europe at MTV Europe Music Awards in 1993. "Sweet Harmony" was later published by Vevo on YouTube in February 2019 and as of December 2022, the video had generated more than 31 million views.

This music video was later spoofed in 1998 by rapper John Forté in the song "Ninety Nine (Flash the Message)" from the album Poly Sci in which the same scenes with nude women is featured, except they have chainsaws.

In popular culture
The song appears in the 1993 film, Piccolo grande amore.

The music video appears in the Beavis and Butt-head episode "Politically Correct", where the duo enjoy the video due to the "nude chicks" and Butt-head stating that it was the "coolest video [he has] ever seen."

An extended version of the song was used during the end credits of a season 7 episode of Dalziel and Pascoe.

The song appears in the 2006 film Alien Autopsy starring Ant and Dec.

The song appears briefly on the episode "Follow the Money" from season 3 of the TV series Narcos.

Track listings

 7-inch single
 "Sweet Harmony" — 5:02
 "Motivation" (Energised)		

 12-inch single
 "Sweet Harmony" (Live The Dream Mix) — 7:15
 "Sweet Harmony" — 5:02
 "Motivation" (Empathised) — 6:44
 "Sweet Harmony" (Fertility Dance Mix) — 5:56

 CD single
 "Sweet Harmony" — 5:02
 "Motivation" (Energised)
			
 CD maxi
 "Sweet Harmony" — 5:04
 "Sweet Harmony" (Live The Dream Mix) — 7:15
 "Motivation" (Exercised) — 7:11
 "Sweet Harmony" (Love The Dub Mix) — 5:14

 EP
 For the 7-track "Sweet Harmony" EP, see the Conscience album.

Charts

Weekly charts

Year-end charts

Cover versions
In 2000, the song was covered on Spanish language by Spanish band Fangoria y Los Sencillos, retitled "Dulce armonía". This version is included on the album Interferencias.

In 2002, the song was covered by British producer Vincent Stormfield and released as "Sweet Harmony '02" by Independiente.

In 2007, the song was covered by Polish pop group Feel on their multi-platinum selling debut album.

In 2007, Ukrainian pop group Tokio released a cover version of the song in the Russian language called "My budem vmeste" ("Мы будем вместе") ("We'll Be Together").

In 2014, Israeli pop singer Mei Finegold released a dance version with Shlomi Levi and Shai Rokach which acted as one of the Israeli Pride 2014 official anthems.

In 2014, Man Without Country released a single with a cover of the song.

In 2016, the song was covered by Sans Souci featuring Pearl Andersson.

In 2017, Liverpudlian indie band She Drew the Gun recorded the song, and accompanied it with a video.

In 2017, Xenturion Prime released a cover of the song.

In 2019, Moderno released a cover of the song, with remixes.

In 2020, Hungarian dj & producer duo Stadiumx made a track, called "Sweet Harmony"; which is the Future House implementation of the original song.

In 2022, Vini Vici & Berg made a track, called "Sweet Harmony"; which is the psy-trance implementation of the original song.

References

1992 songs
1993 singles
East West Records singles
Electronica songs
Music videos directed by Big T.V.
Songs written by Helena Marsh
Songs written by Jon Marsh
The Beloved (band) songs